NMH can refer to:
 National Maternity Hospital, Dublin, Ireland 
 National Museum of History, Taipei, Taiwan
 Neemuch railway station, Madhya Pradesh, India; code NMH
 Nejmeh SC, a Lebanese association football club
 Neutral Milk Hotel, an American rock band
New Medium Helicopter, a British military procurement programme
 Northfield Mount Hermon School, a college preparatory school in Massachusetts
 No More Heroes, a 2008 video game for the Nintendo Wii
 The Norwegian Academy of Music (Norges musikkhøgskole)
 Northwestern Memorial Hospital in Chicago
 nmh, a descendant of the MH Message Handling System

See also
 Nickel–metal hydride battery (NiMH)